Busaco was a community, now extinct, in Union Township, Miami County, in the U.S. state of Indiana.

History
A post office was established at Busaco in 1869, and remained in operation until it was discontinued in 1872. The community was a station on the Lake Erie and Western Railroad.

References

Geography of Miami County, Indiana
Ghost towns in Indiana